Åse Hiorth Lervik (2 June 1933 – 3 November 1997) was a Norwegian literary researcher. Her doctorate thesis from 1971 was a study on Henrik Ibsen's play Brand. She was professor at the University of Tromsø from 1972. She was secretary for Edda. Scandinavian Journal of Literary Research from 1962, and editor of the journal from 1972 to 1985.

References

Academic staff of the University of Tromsø
Academics from Oslo
1933 births
1997 deaths
Norwegian women academics